John Arthur Chapman (May 29, 1905 – December 31, 1962) was a Canadian ice hockey forward. He was born in Winnipeg, Manitoba.

Chapman started his National Hockey League career with the Boston Bruins in 1930.  He would also play for the New York Americans, retiring after the 1940 season to take up coaching duties for the team.  In 1936–37, he was a member of the NHL All-Star team.

Awards and achievements
Allan Cup Championship (1926)
NHL second All-Star team (1936–37)
"Honoured Member" of the Manitoba Hockey Hall of Fame
Calder Cup Champion As Head Coach with the Buffalo Bisons (AHL) (1943–44)
Lester Patrick Cup Champion As Head Coach with the Vancouver Canucks (WHL) (1957–58)

Hockey career
Chapman was born in Winnipeg, Manitoba, Canada and played his first hockey with the Winnipeg Seniors in 1924. In 1925 Chapman joined the Port Arthur Bearcats and helped them win the Allan Cup in 1926. He turned pro with the Springfield Indians of the Canadian-American League in 1927, and was sold to the Boston Bruins in 1928. In 1933 Chapman joined the New York Americans in 1933.

Chapman retired from playing hockey after the 1939–40 season, and went on to serve as head coach of the New York Americans from 1940 to 1942, the Buffalo Bisons of the American Hockey League from 1943 to 1945, and the Vancouver Canucks of the WHL from 1957 to 1958. He became General Manager of the Dunn-Edwards Western Show Corporation and promoted shows in Long Beach, California, for the Long Beach area.

1937 All-Star Game
Chapman played on the first line with Lorne Carr. In 1935–36 with Art leading in assist and rookie Dave "Sweeney" Schriner with the most goals, went on to do the same in the 1936-37 season. Both Art and Sweeny played in the second All-Star game in NHL history in 1937 (NHL.com)

Career statistics

Regular season and playoffs

Coaching career

External links

Art Chapman at Find a Grave

1905 births
1962 deaths
Boston Bruins players
Canadian ice hockey centres
Manitoba Bisons ice hockey players
New York Americans coaches
New York Americans players
Ice hockey people from Winnipeg
Winnipeg Falcons players
Winnipeg Tigers players
Canadian ice hockey coaches
Burials at Forest Lawn Memorial Park (Long Beach)